J-rock is an abbreviation for Japanese rock music.

"J-rock" may also refer to:
J-Rock, a member of the United Kingdom band Big Brovaz
J-Rocks, an Indonesian rock band

See also
J-Roc (disambiguation)
Jay Rock